Tadeusz Kruczkowski (born 5 January 1961 in Jaskołda near Vyalikaya Byerastavitsa) is a Polish-Belarusian historian and activist. He was the President of the Union of Poles in Belarus from 2000 to 2005. He is a lecturer at the Yanka Kupala State University of Grodno.

References

1961 births
Living people
People from Byerastavitsa District
Union of Poles in Belarus
Soviet people of Polish descent
Belarusian people of Polish descent
20th-century Belarusian historians
Belarusian male writers
Male non-fiction writers
21st-century Belarusian historians